Trengove is a surname. Notable people with the surname include:

Jack Trengove (born 1991), Australian rules footballer
Jackson Trengove (born 1990), Australian rules footballer
John Trengove (politician) (fl. 1547), English politician
Henry Trengove (by 1521–1561), Cornish politician